Nikola Cvetinović (born December 19, 1988) is a Serbian professional basketball player for Steaua Bucharest of the Liga Nationala. He played college basketball at the University of Akron.

Professional career
On July 18, 2012, he signed with AEK Larnaca of Cyprus for the 2012–13 season. On October 19, 2013, he signed with BC Brno of the Czech Republic. On December 12, 2013, he signed with CB Valladolid of the Spanish Liga ACB.

After several injuries, on December 30, 2014, Cvetinović signs with Unión Financiera Baloncesto Oviedo of the Spanish second division for the rest of the season. In December 2015, he signed with BC Dzūkija of the Lithuanian Basketball League. He left the club after appearing in only two games. In February 2016, he signed with Slovakian club Inter Bratislava for the rest of the season.

In September 2016, he signed with Araberri BC of the LEB Oro. In August 2017, he moved to Palencia Baloncesto.

On January 4, 2022, Cvetinović signed with Okapi Aalst of the BNXT League. He averaged 11 points and 2.6 rebounds per game in five games. Cvetinović parted ways with the team on February 18.

Serbian national team
Cvetinović was member of the team that represented Serbia at the 2011 Summer Universiade in Shenzhen, finishing as the gold medal winners.

References

External links
ACB.com Profile
Akron Zips Bio
Eurobasket.com Profile
FIBA.com Profile
RealGM.com Profile

1988 births
Living people
AEK Larnaca B.C. players
Akron Zips men's basketball players
Araberri BC players
BC Brno players
BC Dzūkija players
BK Inter Bratislava players
CB Valladolid players
Liga ACB players
Oviedo CB players
Palencia Baloncesto players
Sportspeople from Loznica
Serbian expatriate basketball people in Cyprus
Serbian expatriate basketball people in the Czech Republic
Serbian expatriate basketball people in Lithuania
Serbian expatriate basketball people in Slovakia
Serbian expatriate basketball people in Spain
Serbian expatriate basketball people in the United States
Serbian men's basketball players
Universiade gold medalists for Serbia
Universiade medalists in basketball
Power forwards (basketball)
Okapi Aalstar players
Medalists at the 2011 Summer Universiade